Pracinha can refer to:

 Pracinha, a municipality in São Paulo, Brazil.
 A member of the Brazilian Expeditionary Force of World War II.